720° is a skateboarding video game released in arcades by Atari Games in 1986, in which the player controls a skateboarder skating around a middle-class neighborhood. By doing jumps and tricks, the player can eventually acquire enough points to compete at a skate park. The game's name comes from the "ultimate" trick, turning a full 720° (two complete circles) in the air after jumping off a ramp.

Plot
From official materials:
"It's just you, your trusty skateboard, and a hundred bucks as you skate, jump, slide, spin and move through four levels of difficulty, picking up loose cash, earning money through events, and finally, earning a ticket to one of the big skate parks! If you're lucky, you'll get to buy some rad equipment to make you the coolest skateboarder alive."

Gameplay
The game begins with the player controlling a skateboarder skating around a middle-class neighborhood using common objects as ramps for jumps.

The player begins with a number of "tickets," each of which grants admission to one of four skate parks, or "events," in Skate City, the "hub" between the parks.  When a park is entered, one ticket is expended.  The player gains additional tickets from earning points.  Whenever the player isn't in an event, a bar counts down the time remaining until the arrival of a swarm of killer bees accompanied by the caption of "SKATE OR DIE!". Once the bees arrive, the player still has a small amount of time in which to get to a park, but the longer the player delays, this the faster the bees become, until they are unavoidable. Getting caught by the bees ends the game, though on default settings the player may elect to continue by inserting more money.  Reaching a park with a ticket gives the player the chance to earn points, medals and money with which to upgrade equipment, and resets the timer.

The player constantly races to perform stunts, both in the events and in the park itself, in order to earn the points needed to acquire tickets. Thus, the player's score is directly tied to the amount of time available to play the game. In order to win, the player must complete a total of sixteen events through four hubs, a difficult task.

Structure

The game consists of four levels each consisting of four events:
Ramp: the player climbs around a half-pipe structure, trying to gain more and more height and performing tricks in the air to earn the most possible points. This ends when the timer runs out.
Downhill: a long course consisting of slopes and banks must be navigated to reach a finish line. The quicker the player reaches the finish, the more points are earned.
Slalom: an obstacle course in which the player is required to pass between pairs of yellow flags scattered across the course. Each gate passed grants a little extra time, and scoring depends on time remaining upon crossing the finish line.
Jump: the player jumps from a series of ramps, attempting to hit a bull's-eye target off the screen. There are cryptic marks on the ramp before the jump that provide clues as to the location of the target. This ends when the timer runs out or the player crosses the finish line, whichever comes first.

Scattered through the levels are several "map" icons placed on the ground which when activated show a map with the roads, parks, shops, and the player's location marked on it. Also scattered about the level are hazards and obstacles; jumping over hazards earns points.

The player earns points and money for high scores in each event, and doing well at the events earns the cash needed to buy equipment that improves player performance, and a chance at a bronze, silver, or gold medal. Completing all four events in all four classes completes the game.

Equipment
There are four types of skating equipment to be purchased at different shops. The prices for each are the same, beginning at $25. Upon each return to Skate City after visiting a park, the price increases by $25, to a maximum of $250.

Shoes: Allow higher jumps and faster acceleration.
Board: Allows higher top speed.
Pads: Give quicker recovery from wiping out.
Helmet: Makes the player more aggressive, according to the console description; which translates to making the player spin faster.

Arcade cabinet
The speakers for the game are mounted atop the cabinet in a structure resembling a boombox, in line with the game's skate-rat theme. The display is larger than that of a typical arcade game and very high resolution (similar to that used for Paperboy). The joystick is rigidly mounted to a disc at a steep angle and moves in a circular fashion, instead of in compass directions like standard joysticks. The game also has two buttons, one for "kicking" (which refers not to actual "kicking", but to pushing the skate board with a foot for speed) and the other for jumping.

Development
The game program for the arcade version was written in BLISS.

Other Versions
The game was released to the Commodore 64 (twice) in 1987, the Amstrad CPC and ZX Spectrum in 1988, the Nintendo Entertainment System (NES) in 1989, and the Game Boy Color in 1999. There is also an unreleased port for the Atari Lynx.

The Amstrad CPC, ZX Spectrum, and the first Commodore 64 versions were developed by Tiertex Design Studios and published by U.S. Gold. Sinclair User described it as "US Gold's finest hour."

The Game Boy Color version was developed by Game Brains and published by Midway Games. It was originally released in March 1999 in North America and Europe.

Reception

The game received an overall positive reception among both users and critics. In 1995, Flux magazine ranked the game 79th on their Top 100 Video Games writing: "Unbelievably addicting and completely unique for its time."

Legacy
Emulated versions of the game are included in Midway Arcade Treasures, released in 2003 and 2004, Midway Arcade Origins, released in 2012.

References

External links

720° at the Arcade History database
Contemporary reviews at Solvalou.com

1986 video games
Amstrad CPC games
Arcade video games
Atari arcade games
Cancelled Atari Lynx games
Commodore 64 games
Game Boy Color games
Midway video games
Nintendo Entertainment System games
Extreme sports video games
Skateboarding video games
Tiertex Design Studios games
U.S. Gold games
Video games scored by Ben Daglish
Video games scored by Brad Fuller
Video games developed in the United States
ZX Spectrum games
Multiplayer and single-player video games